Matt Shepard (born ) is an American television play-by-play announcer for the Detroit Tigers on Bally Sports Detroit. He has also covered professional, collegiate and high school sports on both television and radio in Metro Detroit since the 1990s.

Early life and education
Shepard grew up in Farmington Hills, Michigan. He graduated from North Farmington High School in 1983, where he played football and baseball. In 1988, he graduated from Central Michigan University with a degree in broadcasting.

Career
Shepard has served in a variety of roles since being hired by Fox Sports Detroit in 1999. Shepard has done CCHA play-by-play, MHSAA championships (Football & Basketball) play-by-play and fill-in play-by-play for the Pistons and Tigers. He also hosted the Pistons pregame show and the Lions postgame show. He also contributes as a features reporter for the network, and formerly did sports updates at WWJ from 1993–2001, and at WDFN for the Jamie & Brady show from 2001-2007.

Shepard was the host of the Shep, Shower 'N' Shave sports radio morning show which was syndicated by Michigan Media Network and heard on 1130 WDFN in Detroit, 1660 WQLR in Kalamazoo, and 101.1 WGRY in Northern Michigan (Grayling/Roscommon), and is a sports reporter for Fox Sports Detroit. He is currently the radio announcer for University of Michigan basketball and Eastern Michigan University football. He is also currently the play-by-play announcer for Detroit Lions pre-season games, as well as the host of The Ford Lions Report during the regular season, on the Detroit Lions Television Network. Shepard was the 2018 recipient of the prestigious Ty Tyson Award for Excellence in Sports Broadcasting presented by Detroit Sports Media (formerly Detroit Sports Broadcasters Association.)

On January 15, 2019, Shepard was named the play-by-play announcer for the Tigers starting during the 2019 season.

Personal life
Shepard resides in Bloomfield Hills, Michigan with his wife Lisa and four children.

References

Living people
American radio sports announcers
American television sports announcers
American television talk show hosts
Central Michigan University alumni
College baseball announcers in the United States
College basketball announcers in the United States
College football announcers
College hockey announcers in the United States
Detroit Lions announcers
Detroit Pistons announcers
Detroit Tigers announcers
High school basketball announcers in the United States
High school football announcers in the United States
Major League Baseball broadcasters
National Basketball Association broadcasters
National Football League announcers
People from Farmington Hills, Michigan
Year of birth missing (living people)